Keith R. Fraser (17 April 1913 – 13 July 2003) was an Australian rules footballer who played for Collingwood in the Victorian Football League (VFL) during the 1930s. 

Fraser was primarily a ruckman but took spells in the forward pocket. He played in Collingwood's 1935 premiership side as a forward and participated in another premiership the following season when he was given the role of tagging the South Melbourne rovers. His final league game was the 1936 Grand Final.

In 1937 he had received promotion in the Postal department which necessitated his going to Tasmania. He choose Lefroy to play for and had 21 kicks and 11 marks in their winning 1937 premiership game.

He then went off to coach Cygnet in the Huon FA in 1939.

References

Holmesby, Russell and Main, Jim (2007). The Encyclopedia of AFL Footballers. 7th ed. Melbourne: Bas Publishing.

1913 births
Collingwood Football Club players
Collingwood Football Club Premiership players
Lefroy Football Club players
Chelsea Football Club (Australia) players
Australian rules footballers from Victoria (Australia)
2003 deaths
Two-time VFL/AFL Premiership players